The "Third Temple" refers to a hypothetical rebuilt Temple in Jerusalem. Although it remains unbuilt, the notion of and desire for the Third Temple is sacred in Judaism, and particularly in Orthodox Judaism; it is anticipated as the most sacred place of worship for Jews. The Hebrew Bible holds that Jewish prophets called for its construction to be fulfilled prior to, or in tandem with, the Messianic Age. The building of the Third Temple also plays a major role in some interpretations of Christian eschatology.

Among religious Jews, the anticipation of an ultimate future project centred around building the Third Temple at the Temple Mount in the Old City of Jerusalem has been a running theme that, in Israel, is also espoused as an ideological motive. However, the notion of the Third Temple has been contested by Muslims due to the existence of the Dome of the Rock, which was built by the Umayyad Caliphate on top of the site of Solomon's Temple and the Second Temple; tensions between Jews and Muslims over the Temple Mount have carried over politically as one of the major flashpoints of the Israeli–Palestinian conflict, and the area has likewise been a subject of significant debate in the Israeli–Palestinian peace process. Most of the international community has refrained from recognizing any sovereignty over Jerusalem due to conflicting territorial claims between Israel and the Palestinian National Authority, as both sides have asserted it as their capital city (see status of Jerusalem).

Attempts at rebuilding
Since the destruction of the Second Temple in 70 CE, religious Jews have expressed their desire to see the building of a Third Temple on the Temple Mount. Prayer for this is a formal part of the Jewish tradition of thrice daily Amidah prayer. Although it remains unbuilt, the notion of and desire for a Third Temple is sacred in Judaism, particularly Orthodox Judaism, and anticipated as a soon-to-be-built place of worship.

Bar Kochba revolt

Initially, the Emperor Hadrian granted permission to rebuild the temple but then changed his mind. The forces of Simon bar Kokhba captured Jerusalem from the Romans in 132 CE, and construction of a new temple continued. The failure of this revolt led to the writing of the Mishna, as the religious leaders believed that the next attempt to rebuild the temple might be centuries away and memory of the practices and ceremonies would otherwise be lost. As punishment for the revolt, the Romans renamed the city to Aelia Capitolina and the province to Syria Palaestina and Jews were prohibited in the city except for the day of Tisha B'av. However, the Rabbis that survived persecution (see Ten Martyrs) were allowed to continue their school in Javnia, as long as they paid the Fiscus Judaicus.

Julian

There was an aborted project under Roman emperor Julian (361–363 CE) to rebuild the Temple.  Julian is traditionally called Julian the Apostate due to his policy of reversing Emperor Constantine's Christianization campaign by restoring traditional religious practices and holy places across the Empire. As part of this policy, Julian permitted the Jews to build a Third Temple. Rabbi Hilkiyah, one of the leading rabbis of the time, spurned Julian's money, arguing that gentiles should play no part in the rebuilding of the temple. 

According to various ancient sources, including Sozomen (c. 400–450 CE) in his Historia Ecclesiastica and the pagan historian and close friend of Julian, Ammianus Marcellinus, the project of rebuilding the temple was aborted because each time the workers tried to build the temple using the existing substructure, they were burned by terrible flames coming from inside the earth and an earthquake negated what work was made:

The failure to rebuild the Temple has been ascribed to the Galilee earthquake of 363 CE, and to the Jews' ambivalence about the project. Sabotage is a possibility, as is an accidental fire. Divine intervention was the common view among Christian historians of the time.  When Julian was killed in battle after a reign of less than three years, the Christians reasserted control over the empire, and the opportunity to rebuild the Temple ended.

Sassanid vassal state

In 610 CE, the Sassanid Empire drove the Byzantine Empire out of the Middle East, giving the Jews control of Jerusalem for the first time in centuries. The new rulers soon ordered the restart of animal sacrifice for the first time since the time of Bar Kochba. Shortly, before the Byzantines took the area back, the Persians gave control to the Christian population, who tore down the partly built edifice, and turned it into a garbage dump, which is what it was when the Caliph Omar took the city in the 630s.

Muslim conquest of Syria
An Armenian chronicle from the 7th century CE, written by the bishop Sebeos, states that the Jews and Arabs were quarreling amongst each other about their differences of religion during the Siege of Jerusalem in 637 CE but "a man of the sons of Ishmael named Muhammad" gave a "sermon of the Way of Truth, supposedly at God's command" to them saying that they, both the Jews and the Arabs, should unite under the banner of their father Abraham and enter the Holy Land. Sebeos also reports that the Jews began a reconstruction of the temple, but the Arabs expelled them and re-purposed the place for their own prayers.  In turn, these Jews built another temple in a different location.

During the Mongol raids into Syria

In 1267, during the Mongol raids into Syria, an interregnum period between the complete domination of the Levant by the crusader states until 1260 and the conquest of Levant by the Mamluks in 1291, Nachmanides wrote a letter to his son. It contained the following references to the land and the Temple:

Modern rebuilding efforts
Although in mainstream Orthodox Judaism the rebuilding of the Temple is generally left to the coming of the Jewish Messiah and to divine providence, a number of organizations, generally representing a small minority of Orthodox Jews, have been formed with the objective of realizing the immediate construction of a Third Temple in present times.

The Temple Institute and the Temple Mount and Eretz Yisrael Faithful Movement each state that its goal is to build the Third Temple on the Temple Mount (Mount Moriah). The Temple Institute has made several items to be used in the Third Temple.

Attempts to re-establish a Jewish presence on the Temple Mount
In August 1967, after the Israeli capture of the Mount, Rabbi Shlomo Goren, the Chief Rabbi of the Israel Defense Forces (IDF) (and later chief rabbi of the State of Israel), began organizing public prayer for Jews on the Temple Mount. Rabbi Goren was also well known for his controversial positions concerning Jewish sovereignty over the Temple Mount. On August 15, 1967, shortly after the Six-Day War, Goren led a group of fifty Jews onto the Temple Mount, where, fighting off protesting Muslim guards and Israeli police, they defiantly held a prayer service. Goren continued to pray for many years in the Makhkame building overlooking the Temple Mount where he conducted yearly High Holy Days services. His call for the establishment of a synagogue on the Temple Mount has subsequently been reiterated by his brother-in-law, the Chief Rabbi of Haifa, She'ar Yashuv Cohen.

Goren was sharply criticized by the Israeli Defense Ministry, who, noting Goren's senior rank, called his behaviour inappropriate. The episode led the Chief Rabbis of the time to restate the accepted laws of Judaism that no Jews were allowed on the mount due to issues of ritual impurity. The secular authorities welcomed this ruling as it preserved the status quo with the Jerusalem Islamic Waqf. Disagreeing with his colleagues, Goren continually maintained that Jews were not only permitted, but commanded, to ascend and pray on the mount.

Goren repeatedly advocated or supported building a Third Temple on the Temple Mount from the 1960s onward, and was associated with various messianic projects involving the site. In the summer of 1983, Goren and several other rabbis joined Rabbi Yehuda Getz, who worked for the Religious Affairs Ministry at the Western Wall, in touring a chamber underneath the mount that Getz had excavated, where the two claimed to have seen the Ark of the Covenant. The tunnel was shortly discovered and resulted in a massive brawl between young Jews and Arabs in the area. The tunnel was quickly sealed with concrete by Israeli police. The sealed entrance can be seen from the Western Wall Tunnel, which opened to the public in 1996.

The Chief Rabbis of Israel, Isser Yehuda Unterman and Yitzhak Nissim, together with other leading rabbis, asserted that "For generations we have warned against and refrained from entering any part of the Temple Mount." A recent study of this rabbinical ruling suggests that it was both "unprecedented" and possibly prompted by governmental pressure on the rabbis, and "brilliant" in preventing Muslim–Jewish friction on the Mount. Rabbinical consensus in the Religious Zionist stream of Orthodox Judaism continues to hold that it is forbidden for Jews to enter any part of the Temple Mount and in January 2005 a declaration was signed confirming the 1967 decision. On the eve of Shavuot in 2014, or 6th Sivan, 5774 in the Hebrew calendar, 400 Jews ascended the Temple Mount; some were photographed in prayer.

Obstacles
The most immediate and obvious obstacle to realization of these goals is the fact that two historic Islamic structures which are 13 centuries old, namely the Al Aqsa Mosque and the Dome of the Rock, are built on top of the Temple Mount. Any efforts to damage or reduce access to these sites, or to build Jewish structures within, between, beneath, beside, cantilevered on top of, or instead of them, could lead to severe international conflicts, given the association of the Muslim world with these holy places.

The Dome of the Rock is regarded as occupying the actual space where the Second Temple once stood, but some scholars disagree and instead claim that the Temple was located either just north of the Dome of the Rock, or about 200 meters south of it, with access to the Gihon fresh water spring, or perhaps between the Dome of the Rock and the Al Aqsa Mosque.

In addition, most Orthodox Jewish scholars reject any attempts to build the Temple before the coming of Messiah. This is because there are many doubts as to the exact location in which it is required to be built. For example, while measurements are given in cubits, there exists a controversy whether this unit of measurement equals 1.84 feet, the scholarly consensus, or 1.43 feet, put forward by respected historian Asher Selig Kaufman. Without exact knowledge of the size of a cubit, the altar could not be built. The Talmud recounts that the building of the Second Temple was only possible under the direct prophetic guidance of Haggai, Zechariah, and Malachi. Without valid prophetic revelation, it would be impossible to rebuild the Temple, even if the mosques no longer occupied its location.

Despite obstacles, efforts are under way by various analytical groups to articulate the benefits to local and regional constituents and participants to encourage developments that would progressively align in support. It is known from the Talmud that in the time of King Agrippa, Jerusalem was filled with millions of visitors and pilgrims from the entire region. Some current opinions suggest that the potential of spiritual tourism would support the growth goals of the Mayor of Jerusalem for 10 million tourists annually. This would provide a significant boost to the economy and would benefit people locally and regionally, many of whom live in poverty.

Status of Temple Mount

Many rabbis interpret halakha (Jewish religious law) as prohibiting Jews from entering the Holy of Holies. The situation is complicated as the Dome of the Rock and Al-Aqsa Mosque fall under control of Muslim clerics, but Israeli police administer its security. According to CNN:
 A 2000 visit to the Temple Mount by Ariel Sharon resulted in a clash between "stone-throwing Palestinians and Israeli troops, who fired tear gas and rubber bullets into the crowd," coinciding with the beginning of the Second Intifada (widely interpreted as having ended in 2005).  During the Sukkot festival in 2006, National Union Knesset member Uri Ariel visited the Temple Mount without incident and the Israeli police witnessed no provocation by the protestors.

Jewish views

Orthodox Judaism

Orthodox Judaism believes in the rebuilding of a Third Temple and the resumption of korban (sacrifices), although there is disagreement about how rebuilding should take place. Orthodox scholars and rabbinic authorities generally believe that rebuilding should occur in the era of the Jewish messiah at the hand of divine providence, although a minority position, following the opinion of Maimonides, holds that Jews should endeavour to rebuild the temple themselves, whenever possible.

The generally accepted position among Orthodox Jews is that the full order of the sacrifices will be resumed upon the building of the Temple. This belief is embedded in Orthodox Jewish prayer services. Three times a day, Orthodox Jews recite the Amidah, which contains prayers for the Temple's restoration and for the resumption of sacrifices, and every day there is a recitation of the order of the day's sacrifices and the psalms the Levites would have sung that day. Conservative, Reform, and Reconstructionist authorities disavow all belief in the resumption of korban.

Maimonides wrote in The Guide for the Perplexed "that God deliberately has moved Jews away from sacrifices towards prayer, as prayer is a higher form of worship". However, in his Jewish legal code, the Mishneh Torah, he states that animal sacrifices will resume in the Third Temple, and details how they will be carried out. Some attribute to Rabbi Abraham Isaac Kook the view that animal sacrifices will not be reinstituted. These views on the Temple service are sometimes misconstrued (for example, in Olat Raiyah, commenting on the prophecy of Malachi ("Then the grain-offering of Judah and Jerusalem will be pleasing to God as in the days of old and as in former years" [Malachi 3:4]), Kook indicates that only grain offerings will be offered in the reinstated Temple service, while in a related essay from Igrot HaRaiyah he suggests otherwise.

Conservative Judaism
Conservative Judaism believes in a messiah and in a rebuilt Temple, but does not believe in the restoration of sacrifices. Accordingly, Conservative Judaism's Committee on Jewish Law and Standards has modified the prayers. Conservative prayerbooks call for the restoration of Temple, but do not ask for resumption of sacrifices. The Orthodox study session on sacrifices in the daily morning service has been replaced with the Talmudic passages teaching that deeds of loving-kindness now atone for sin.

In the daily Amidah prayer, the central prayer in Jewish services, the petitions to accept the "fire offerings of Israel" and "the grain-offering of Judah and Jerusalem" (Malachi 3:4) are removed. In the special Mussaf Amidah prayer said on Shabbat and Jewish holidays, the Hebrew phrase na'ase ve'nakriv (we will present and sacrifice) is modified to read to asu ve'hikrivu (they presented and sacrificed), implying that sacrifices are a thing of the past. The prayer for the restoration of "the House of our lives" and the Shekhinah to dwell "among us" in the weekday Torah reading service is retained in Conservative prayer books, although not all Conservative services say it. In Conservative prayer books, words and phrases that have dual meaning, referring to both Temple features and theological or poetic concepts, are generally retained. Translations and commentaries, however, generally refer to the poetic or theological meanings only. Conservative Judaism also takes an intermediate position on Kohanim and Levites, preserving patrilineal tribal descent and some aspects of their roles, but lifting restrictions on whom Kohanim are permitted to marry.

In 2006, the Committee on Jewish Law and Standards adapted a series of responsa on the subject of the role, in Conservative Judaism, of Niddah, a description of a woman during menstruation, which was considered in relation to the role of Temple-related concepts of ritual purity within contemporary Judaism. One responsum adopted by a majority of the Committee held that concepts of ritual purity relevant to entry into the Temple are no longer applicable to contemporary Judaism and accepted a proposal to change the term "family purity" to "family holiness" and to explain the continuing observance of niddah on a different basis from continuity with Temple practices. Another responsum, also adopted by a majority of the committee, called for retaining existing observances, terminology, and rationale, and held that these Temple-related observances and concepts continued to have contemporary impact and meaning. Thus, consistent with Conservative Judaism's philosophy of pluralism, both views of the continuing relevance of Temple-related concepts of ritual purity are permissible Conservative views.

Theodor Herzl includes the reconstructed Temple in his novel Altneuland, but along with an intact Dome of the Rock.

Reform Judaism

Reform Judaism does not believe in the rebuilding of a central Temple or a restoration of Temple sacrifices or worship. It regards the Temple and sacrificial era as a period of a more primitive form of ritual from which Judaism has evolved and should not return. It also believes a special role for Kohanim and Levites represents a caste system incompatible with modern principles of egalitarianism, and does not preserve these roles. Furthermore, there is a Reform view that the shul or synagogue is a modern Temple; hence, "Temple" appears in numerous congregation names in Reform Judaism. Indeed, the re-designation of the synagogue as "temple" was one of the hallmarks of early Reform in 19th-century Germany, when Berlin was declared the new Jerusalem, and Reform Jewry sought to demonstrate their staunch German nationalism. The Anti-Zionism that characterized Reform Judaism throughout much of its history subsided significantly following the Holocaust and the subsequent establishment and later successes of the modern state of Israel. The belief in the return of the Jews to the Temple in Jerusalem is not part of mainstream Reform Judaism however.

Christian views

While there are a number of differing views amongst Christianity with regard to the significance or the requirement of a third temple being built in Jerusalem, according to the writers of the New Testament, the New Covenant (spoken of in Jeremiah 31:31–34) is marked by the indwelling of the Holy Spirit in the believer (Ezekiel 36:26–27) and that therefore every believer's body and every gathering of believers comprise the temple, or that the temple has been superseded. Paul illustrates this concept in his letter to the believers at Corinth:

This idea is related to the belief that Christ himself, having claimed to be and do what the temple was and did, is the new temple, and that his people, as a part of the "body of Christ" (meaning the church), are part of this temple as well. The result, according to N. T. Wright, is that the earthly temple (along with the city of Jerusalem and the Land of Israel) is no longer of any spiritual significance:
[Paul] refers to the church, and indeed to individual Christians, as the 'temple of the living God' (1 Cor. 3:16, 6:19). To Western Christians, thinking anachronistically of the temple as simply the Jewish equivalent of a cathedral, the image is simply one metaphor among many and without much apparent significance. For a first-century Jew, however, the Temple had an enormous significance; as a result, when Paul uses such an image within twenty-five years of the Crucifixion (with the actual temple still standing), it is a striking index of the immense change that has taken place in his [Paul’s] thought. The Temple had been superseded by the Church. If this is so for the Temple, and in Romans 4 for the Land, then it must a fortiori be the case for Jerusalem, which formed the concentric circle in between those two in the normal Jewish worldview.

In the teaching of both Jesus and Paul, then, according to Wright,

Ben F. Meyer, also, argued that Jesus applied prophecy regarding Zion and temple to himself and his followers:
[Jesus] affirmed the prophecies of salvation with their end-time imagery Zion and the temple—belonging to the eschatological themes that the "pilgrimage of the peoples" evoked. But contrary to the common expectation of his contemporaries, Jesus expected the destruction of the temple in the coming eschatological ordeal (Mark 13:2=Matt 24:2=Luke 21:6). The combination seems contradictory. How could he simultaneously predict the ruin of the temple in the ordeal and affirm the end-time fulfilment of promise and prophecy on Zion and temple? The paradox is irresolvable until one takes note of another trait of Jesus' words on the imagery of Zion and temple, namely, the consistent application to his own disciples of Zion- and temple-imagery: the city on the mountain (Matt 5:14; cf. Thomas, 32), the cosmic rock (Matt 16:18; cf. John 1:42), the new sanctuary (Mark 14:58; Matt 26:61). The mass of promise and prophecy will come to fulfilment in this eschatological and messianic circle of believers.

Some would therefore see the need for a third temple as being diminished, redundant, or entirely foreclosed and superseded, while others take a position that the building of the third temple is an integral part of Christian eschatology. The various perspectives on the significance of the building of a third temple within Christianity are therefore generally linked to a number of factors including: the level of literal or spiritual interpretation applied to what is taken to be "end-time" prophecy; the perceived relationships between various scriptures such as Daniel, the Olivet discourse, 2 Thessalonians and Ezekiel (amongst others); whether or not a dual-covenant is considered to be in place; and whether Old Testament promises of the restoration of Israel remain unfulfilled or have all come true in the Messiah (2 Corinthians 1:20). Such factors determine, for example, whether Daniel  or 2 Thessalonians  are read as referring to a still-future physically restored third temple.

A number of these perspectives are illustrated below.

Christian mainstream
The dominant view within Roman Catholic, Eastern Orthodox and Protestant Christianity is that animal sacrifices within the Temple were a foreshadowing of the sacrifice Jesus made for the sins of the world through his crucifixion and shedding of his blood on the first day of Passover. The Epistle to the Hebrews is often cited in support of this view: the temple sacrifices are described as being imperfect, since they require repeating (ch. 10:1–4), and as belonging to a covenant that was "becoming obsolete and growing old" and was "ready to vanish away" (ch. 8:13, ESV). See also Abrogation of Old Covenant laws. Christ's crucifixion, being a sacrifice which dealt with sin once and for all, negated any need for further animal sacrifice. Christ himself is compared to the High Priest who was always standing and performing rituals and sacrifices. Christ, however, having performed his sacrifice, "sat down" — perfection having been finally attained (ch. 10:11–14,18). Further, the veil or curtain to the Holy of Holies is seen as having been torn asunder at the crucifixion – figuratively in connection with this theology (Ch 10:19–21), and literally according to the Gospel of Matthew (ch 27:50–51). For these reasons, a third temple, whose partial purpose would be the re-institution of animal sacrifices, is seen as unnecessary and thus superseded. Irenaeus and Hippolytus were among early church writers who foresaw a rebuilding of the Temple, as necessary for the preparation for the reign of the Antichrist.

Additionally, Jesus himself stated, in response to a Samaritan asking whether it is right to worship on Mount Gerizim or Mount Zion, that "a time is coming when you will worship the Father neither on this mountain nor in Jerusalem... But in spirit and in truth". He stated of the Herodian temple, "Not one stone will be left on another; every one of them will be thrown down" – John 4:21, Luke 21:6.

Protestant

Dispensationalist

Those Protestants who do believe in the importance of a future rebuilt temple (viz., some dispensationalists) hold that the importance of the sacrificial system shifts to a Memorial of the Cross, given the text of Ezekiel Chapters 39 and following (in addition to Millennial references to the Temple in other Old Testament passages); since Ezekiel explains at length the construction and nature of the Millennial temple, in which Jews will once again hold the priesthood; some others hold that perhaps it was not eliminated with Jesus' sacrifice for sin, but is a ceremonial object lesson for confession and forgiveness (somewhat like water baptism and Communion are today); and that such animal sacrifices would still be appropriate for ritual cleansing and for acts of celebration and thanksgiving toward God. Some dispensationalists believe this will be the case with the Second Coming when Jesus reigns over earth from the city of New Jerusalem.

 Some interpret a passage in the Book of Daniel, Daniel 12:11, as a prophecy that the end of this age will occur shortly after sacrifices are ended in the newly rebuilt temple. 

In 1762, Charles Wesley wrote:

Dispensational Evangelical

Many Evangelical Christians believe that New Testament prophecies associated with the Jewish Temple, such as Matthew 24–25 and 2 Thessalonians 2:1–12, were not completely fulfilled during the Roman destruction of Jerusalem in AD 70 (a belief of full preterism) and that these prophecies refer to a future temple. This view is a core part of dispensationalism, an interpretative framework of the Bible that stresses biblical literalism and asserts that the Jews remain God's chosen people. According to dispensationalist theologians, such as Hal Lindsey and Tim LaHaye, the Third Temple will be rebuilt when the Antichrist, often identified as the political leader of a trans-national alliance similar to the European Union or the United Nations, secures a peace treaty between the modern nation of Israel and its neighbours following a global war. The Antichrist later uses the temple as a venue for proclaiming himself as God and the long-awaited Messiah, demanding worship from humanity.

Roman Catholic and Eastern Orthodox

Catholic and Eastern Orthodox Christians believe that the Eucharist, which they hold to be one in substance with the one self-sacrifice of Christ on the Cross, is a far superior offering when compared with the merely preparatory temple sacrifices, as explained in the Epistle to the Hebrews. They also believe that Christ Himself is the New Temple, as spoken of in the Book of Revelation and that Revelation can best be understood as the Eucharist, heaven on earth. Their church buildings are meant to model Solomon's Temple, with the Tabernacle, containing the Eucharist, being considered the new "Holy of Holies." Therefore, they do not attach any significance to a possible future rebuilding of the Jerusalem Temple.

The Orthodox also quote Daniel 9:27 ("... he shall cause the sacrifice and the oblation to cease ...") to show that the sacrifices would stop with the arrival of the Messiah, and mention that according to Jesus, St. Paul and the Holy Fathers, the temple will only be rebuilt in the times of the Antichrist.

Quotations:
Matthew 24:15
"When you see the desolating abomination spoken of through Daniel the prophet standing in the holy place (let the reader understand)...."

2 Thessalonians 2:3–4
"Let no one deceive you in any way. For unless the apostasy comes first and the lawless one is revealed,* the one doomed to perdition, who opposes and exalts himself above every so-called god and object of worship, so as to seat himself in the temple of God,* claiming that he is a god — do you not recall that while I was still with you I told you these things?"

Latter Day Saints
Latter Day Saints believe that the Jews will build the Third Temple before the Second Coming of Jesus Christ, and after the Second Coming the Jews will accept Jesus as the Messiah. Most Jews will then embrace the fullness of the Gospel of Jesus Christ. Then, it is believed, the Third Temple will be God's temple as Christ reigns on the earth, and it will become the Jerusalem LDS Temple. There will be many LDS Temples but two main temples will jointly serve as the central governing places – the Jerusalem Temple will function as the resurrected Jesus Christ's Eastern Hemisphere governing place and the New Jerusalem Temple in Independence, Missouri will function as the resurrected Jesus Christ's Western Hemisphere governing place. Both of these two temples will have thrones for Jesus Christ to sit on during his millennial reign.

The Community of Christ, the second largest denomination of the Latter Day Saint movement, has operated a temple, open to the public, in Independence, Missouri, since 1994. Another denomination of the LDS movement, the Church of Christ (Temple Lot), possess the Temple Lot, the actual spot on which the Temple will be built.

Muslim view
Most Muslims view the movement for the building of a Third Temple on the Temple Mount as an affront to Islam due to the presence of the Al-Aqsa Mosque and the Dome of the Rock in the stead of the former Holy Temple. Today the area is regarded by the majority of Muslims as the third holiest site in Islam. Muslims are resolute in calling for recognition of their exclusive rights over the site and demand that it be wholly transferred to Muslim sovereignty; furthermore, some Muslims deny any association with the Mount to the former Jewish Temples which stood at the site.

The Organisation of Islamic Cooperation was initiated in reaction to Denis Michael Rohan, an Australian Christian who set fire to a 12th-century pulpit of the Al-Aqsa mosque, in an attempt to initiate the second coming of Christ. The protection of the Al-Aqsa Mosque is in the primary mandate of the Organisation of Islamic Cooperation.

Baháʼí view
In the Baháʼí Faith, the prophecy of the Third Temple was fulfilled with the writing of the Súriy-i-Haykal by Bahá'u'lláh in pentacle form. The Súriy-i-Haykal or Tablet of the Temple, is a composite work which consists of a tablet followed by five messages addressed to world leaders; shortly after its completion, Bahá'u'lláh instructed the tablet be written in the form of a pentacle, symbolizing the human temple and added to it the conclusion:

Shoghi Effendi, the head of the Baháʼí Faith in the first half of the 20th century, explained that this verse refers to the prophecy in the Hebrew Bible where Zechariah had promised the rebuilding of the Temple in the End Times as fulfilled in the return of the Manifestation of God, Bahá'u'lláh, in a human temple. Throughout the tablet, Bahá'u'lláh addresses the Temple (himself) and explains the glory which is invested in it allowing all the nations of the world to find redemption. In the tablet, Bahá'u'lláh states that the Manifestation of God is a pure mirror that reflects the sovereignty of God and manifests God's beauty and grandeur to mankind. In essence, Bahá'u'lláh explains that the Manifestation of God is a "Living Temple" and Bahá'u'lláh addresses the organs and limbs of the human body and bids each to focus on God and not the earthly world.

See also
 Apocalypse of Zerubbabel
 Beautiful Gate
 Ezekiel's Temple
 Tzvi Hirsh Kaliszer
 Red heifer
 Temple
 TempleOS

References

Further reading
 Gorenberg, Gershom. The End of Days : Fundamentalism and the Struggle for the Temple Mount. Free Press, 2000.  (Journalist's view)
 David Ha'ivri. Reclaiming the Temple Mount. HaMeir L'David, 2006.  (Overview of the History of the Temple Mount and advocacy of immediate rebuilding of a Third Temple)
 Grant R. Jeffrey. The New Temple and The Second Coming. WaterBrook Press, 2007. 
 N. T. Wright, "Jerusalem in the New Testament" (1994) (Jesus claimed to do and be what the Temple was and did)
 Ben F. Meyer. "The Temple at the Navel of the Earth," in Christus Faber: the master builder and the house of God. Princeton Theological Monograph Series no. 29. Allison Park, Pa.: Pickwick Publications, 1992. (Arguing that, for Jesus, the real referents of the imagery of biblical promise—Zion, or cosmic rock and, on it, God's gleaming temple of the end of days—were himself and his messianic remnant of believers.)

Book of Ezekiel
Jewish messianism
Judaism-related controversies
Neo-Zionism
Religious Zionism
Tabernacle and Temples in Jerusalem
Temple Mount
Proposed religious places
Proposed buildings and structures in Israel